Chahe is a town in Xuanhan County, Dazhou, Sichuan. , it administers Chayun Community and the following eleven villages:
Chahe Village
Wusheng Village
Linggang Village
Shengshui Village
Changping Village
Liaoye Village
Guoshan Village
Longguan Village
Banxian Village
Zhongping Village
Jingping Village

References

Xuanhan County
Towns in Sichuan